Tamara N. Trujillo is an American politician serving as a member of the Wyoming House of Representatives for the 44th district. Elected in November 2022, she assumed office on January 2, 2023.

Career 
Prior to entering politics, Trujillo worked for HF Sinclair and two trucking companies. She was elected to the Wyoming House of Representatives in November 2022, defeating her cousin, John Romero-Martinez. She assumed office on January 2, 2023.

References 

Living people
Wyoming Republicans
Members of the Wyoming House of Representatives
Women state legislators in Wyoming
21st-century American politicians
Year of birth missing (living people)